Kalah Now is a village in Almalu Rural District, Nazarkahrizi District, Hashtrud County, East Azerbaijan Province, Iran. At the 2006 census, its population was 162, in 34 families.

References 

Towns and villages in Hashtrud County